T. Gopinath Naidu (born 25 October in Kuala Lumpur), also commonly known as the "Wonder Boy", is a former Malaysian footballer who was a striker for Kuala Lumpur FA, Perak FA and the Malaysia national football team.

Career 
Gopinath Naidu started his football career with Kuala Lumpur's youth team in 1986. At that time he was only 12 and he represented the state and country in various age group tournaments. He won top-scorer and best player awards at the Malaysia national tournaments and internationally. His impressive performance with Kuala Lumpur's youth team and Malaysian's national youth team earned him an attachment with Aston Villa at that time being managed by former Kuala Lumpur coach Josef Venglos and Ron Atkinson. Later, he moved to Bayer Leverkusen under Reinhard Saftig. He has experience playing with players such as Brazilian Jorginho, Christian Worns, Ulf Kirsten, Dwight Yorke, Paul McGrath, Steve Staunton, Bryan Robson, Brazilians Branco, Juninho and others.

He also trained under several notable coaches, including Dettmar Cramer, Eckhard Krautzun, Claude Le Roy, Ken Shellito, Colin Harvey, Dick Bate and local coaches such as M. Karathu, Chow Kwai Lam, Khaidir Buyong, B. Sathianathan, Dato and Ahmad Shafie.

In 1992, he was offered a professional playing contract with Kuala Lumpur by President Elyas Omar who was the mayor of Kuala Lumpur. During this period, he played against several top players and teams such as Aston Villa, Inter Milan, Arsenal, Bayern Munich, Middlesbrough, Monaco, AEK Athens, FC Kaiserslautern and Everton.

While he was reaching at his peak he sustain a serious knee injury which he underwent surgeries in Germany, Hong Kong and Malaysia. He returned and played for Kuala Lumpur, winning the 1993 and 1994 Malaysia FA Cup, which gained him the title as a top scorer. This resulted in him being recruited to play the 1994 Asian Games in Hiroshima and the pre-qualifying for the 1996 Summer Olympics Atlanta team under Claude Le Roy in 1994.

He continued playing for the Malaysian League for Kuala Lumpur, and later for Perak. However, due to his serious anterior knee cruciate ligament injuries throughout his football career, Gopi made the decision to retire as a professional footballer. After retirement from football, he moved to Hong Kong in 1998 and is attached with East Asia sports consultancy.

Personal life
Gopinath Naidu is the father of two children.

Gallery

References

Sources
 New Straits Times – Google News Archive Search
 New Straits Times – Google News Archive Search
 New Straits Times – Google News Archive Search "Injured Gopi Fighting Against Time" New Straits Times 2 February 1996 page 18
 "Perak Have Faith in Duo" New Straits Times 12 May 1996
 New Straits Times – Google News Archive Search
 New Straits Times – Google News Archive Search
 New Straits Times – Google News Archive Search
 New Straits Times – Google News Archive Search
 New Straits Times – Google News Archive Search
 New Sunday Times – Google News Archive Search

Living people
Malaysian footballers
Perak F.C. players
Kuala Lumpur City F.C. players
Association footballers not categorized by position
Year of birth missing (living people)